Witthaya Moonwong (born 9 October 1993) is a professional footballer from Thailand. He currently plays for Uthai Thani in the Thai League 3.

Honours

Club
Uthai Thani
Thai League 3 (1): 2021–22
Thai League 3 Northern Region (1): 2021–22

International
Thailand U-19
 AFF U-19 Youth Championship Champions (1): 2011

External links
 Goal.com 
 Players Profile - info.thscore.com
 

1993 births
Living people
Witthaya Moonwong
Witthaya Moonwong
Association football defenders
Witthaya Moonwong
Witthaya Moonwong
Witthaya Moonwong
Witthaya Moonwong
Witthaya Moonwong
Witthaya Moonwong